{{safesubst:#invoke:RfD|||month = March
|day = 20
|year = 2023
|time = 15:45
|timestamp = 20230320154526

|content=
REDIRECT :Serbia–NATO relations

}}